The 1988 LPGA Championship was held May 19–22 at Jack Nicklaus Golf Center at Kings Island in Mason, Ohio, a suburb northeast of Cincinnati. Played on the Grizzly Course, this was the 34th edition of the LPGA Championship.

Sherri Turner birdied the final two holes for a final round 67 and won her only major championship, one stroke ahead of runner-up Amy Alcott. Turner began the round six strokes behind Alcott, the 54-hole leader, in a tie for tenth place. It was the first of her three LPGA Tour wins.

Past champions in the field

Made the cut

Source:

Missed the cut

Source:
 Pat Bradley (1986) did not play

Final leaderboard
Sunday, May 22, 1988

Source:

References

External links
Golf Observer leaderboard

Women's PGA Championship
Golf in Ohio
LPGA Championship
LPGA Championship
LPGA Championship
LPGA Championship
Women's sports in Ohio